KMGV is in the Fresno, California area and broadcasts at 97.9 FM.  It is owned by Cumulus Media.  Its studios are located at the Radio City building on Shaw Avenue in North Fresno and its transmitter is at Meadow Lakes in Sierra National Forest.

History
97.9 FM was originally owned by the McClatchy family and was originally the FM sister station to KMJ, with the callsign KMJ-FM. Known as "Music 98", the station broadcast classical music, then pop standards. In 1981 the callsign was changed to KNAX and the format was changed to country. KNAX's competition at that time was KMAK, an AM station that had adopted the Country format around 1966. By 1985, KMAK had changed format to News/Talk, and KNAX was the sole Country outlet for the Fresno area.

This lasted until 1992 when 93.7 changed format to Country as "Kiss Country". Both stations co-existed until KNAX was sold to Henry Broadcasting, which also owned KSKS. The format of KNAX was altered to a mix of classic Country with a few currents at this time. The station adopted the nickname of "Kickin' Country 98", and the original KNAX logo was replaced.

In July 1996, KNAX and KRBT were sold from Osborn Communications to American Radio Systems, which would then sell to Infinity Broadcasting (now CBS Radio) in 1998.

On July 3, 1998, with the emergence of a new format called "Jammin' Oldies" consisting of Classic R&B/Soul and Disco, the owners decided to take KNAX in a different direction and dropped country in favor of this current format and call letters KMGV, "Mega 97.9".

Peak Broadcasting acquired KMGV, and several other Fresno market stations, in November 2006 from CBS Radio. On August 30, 2013, a deal was announced in which Townsquare Media would purchase Peak Broadcasting, and then immediately swap Peak's Fresno stations, including KMGV, to Cumulus Media in exchange for Cumulus' stations in Dubuque, Iowa and Poughkeepsie, New York. The deal is part of Cumulus' acquisition of Dial Global; Peak, Townsquare, and Dial Global are all controlled by Oaktree Capital Management. The sale to Cumulus was completed on November 14, 2013.

References

External links
KMGV Website

MGV
Rhythmic oldies radio stations in the United States
Cumulus Media radio stations